Amerila simillima is a moth of the subfamily Arctiinae. It was described by Walter Rothschild in 1917. It is found in Australia.

References

  (1917). "Some new moths of the families Arctiidae and Eupterotidae". Novitates Zoologicae 24 (3): 475-492.

Moths described in 1917
Amerilini
Moths of Australia